Judge Barber may refer to:

Thomas Barber (judge) (born 1966), judge of the United States District Court for the Middle District of Florida
Orion M. Barber (1857–1930), associate judge of the United States Court of Customs and Patent Appeals

See also
Carl Barbier (born 1944), judge of the United States District Court for the Eastern District of Louisiana
Philip P. Barbour (1783–1841), associate justice of the Supreme Court of the United States
William H. Barbour Jr. (1941–2021), judge of the United States District Court for the Southern District of Mississippi